Neodavisia melusina is a species of snout moth in the genus Neodavisia. It is found in Texas.

References

Moths described in 1984
Pyralinae